Frank Thieme (born 18 March 1963) is a German former yacht racer who competed in the 2000 Summer Olympics.

References

1963 births
Living people
German male sailors (sport)
Olympic sailors of Germany
Sailors at the 2000 Summer Olympics – 470
Place of birth missing (living people)